Arthur Yancey Wear (March 1, 1880 – November 6, 1918) was an American tennis player who competed in the 1904 Summer Olympics. He was the son of James H. Wear and the brother of Joseph Wear. In 1904 he won the bronze medal with his partner Clarence Gamble in the doubles competition. He died during the Meuse-Argonne Offensive in France in World War I.

Personal life
Wear served as a captain in the 89th Infantry Division during World War I. He died of a perforated ulcer during the Meuse-Argonne Offensive in November 1918. He is buried at Meuse-Argonne American Cemetery.

See also
 List of Olympians killed in World War I

References

External links
 
 profile

1880 births
1918 deaths
American male tennis players
Olympic bronze medalists for the United States in tennis
Tennis players at the 1904 Summer Olympics
Medalists at the 1904 Summer Olympics
American military personnel killed in World War I
Deaths from ulcers
United States Army officers
United States Army personnel of World War I